Roes Welcome Sound is a long channel at the northwest end of Hudson Bay in Kivalliq Region, Nunavut, Canada between the mainland on the west and Southampton Island on the east. It opens south into Hudson Bay. Its north end joins Repulse Bay which is connected east through Frozen Strait to Foxe Basin, thereby making Southampton Island an island. Wager Bay is a western branch.

In 1613 it was reached by Thomas Button who called it 'Ne Ultra'. It is named after Sir Thomas Roe, friend and sponsor of explorer Luke Fox's 1631 Arctic voyage. Capt. Parry, trying to find the Northwest Passage during his 1821 voyage, wrote:
"On an inspection of the charts, I think it will also appear probable that a communication will one day be found to exist between this inlet (Prince Regent's) and Hudson's Bay, either through the broad and unexplored channel called Sir Thomas Roe's Welcome, or through Repulse Bay, which has not yet been satisfactorily examined."

Roes Welcome Sound is a bowhead whale migratory path.

References

Sounds of Kivalliq Region
Foxe Basin